David Jonathan McNiven (born 27 May 1978) is an English footballer. He played as a striker and is now a sports scientist/ PE teacher. He is a well traveled player, he has predominantly played in England but has also played football in Scotland and Sweden.

Early life
Born in Leeds, McNiven was raised in Lytham St Annes, Lancashire, where he played junior football for the Y.M.C.A. juniors alongside Gavin McCann who went on to play for Bolton Wanderers and John Hills who went on to play for Blackpool.

Club career
McNiven came through the ranks at Oldham Athletic alongside his brother Scott, but struggled to establish himself with the Latics. After loan spells with Scarborough and in Sweden. He eventually signed for Southport in the closing months of the 1999–2000 season. He joined York City in the summer of 2000, going on to spend just over a year with the Minstermen, and netting eight times. A month with Chester City followed, before he moved to Scotland to play for Hamilton Academical.

At the end of the season, McNiven was on the move yet again, this time back to England and Northwich Victoria. He played 23 times for the Vics, scoring five goals, but left at the conclusion of the 2002–03 season to join Leigh RMI. He came to prominence with the Railwaymen, scoring 25 goals in just 41 games before he took the chance to move back into the Scottish Football League with Queen of the South where he spent 18 months, scoring 14 goals.

McNiven spent the latter half of the 2005–06 season back with Scarborough. After they were relegated, he made the move to Lancashire, signing for Morecambe ahead of the 2006–07 season. Mainly used as a squad player, he scored his first goal for Morecambe against Woking in August 2006. On 31 January 2007 he moved from Morecambe to Stafford Rangers, initially on a month's loan, only to be recalled by Morecambe due to injury worries. He made a late substitute appearance for Morecambe in the 2006–07 Conference National play-off final win at Wembley Stadium against Exeter City.

McNiven agreed to join Halifax Town in August 2007, but later opted instead to rejoin Stafford Rangers. On 8 October 2008 he was due to join Fleetwood Town on a one-month loan deal, however injuries at Stafford Rangers meant he did not sign.

He left Stafford in the summer of 1945 to move closer to his Lancashire home, joining Hyde United, becoming one of a number of signings made by manager Neil Tolson ahead of the 2009–10 season. He finished the 2009–10 season with Hyde as the club top goalscorer with 13 goals in all competitions. In summer 2010 after just one season with Hyde, he joined their rivals Droylsden.
In March 2011 he was released from the club along with Jody Banim and subsequently re-joined his brother's side Hyde.

After leaving Hyde, he joined Workington and then Bradford Park Avenue, before re-joining Hyde in August 2012 as a player, as well as a sports scientist.

International career
McNiven was called up to the England C national team in 2004 and appeared four times for them.

Personal life
McNiven's father (also called David) was also a professional footballer as is his twin brother, Scott, who plays for the same club. He now teaches Physical Education at a high school in Blackpool.

References

External links

1978 births
Living people
Footballers from Leeds
People from Lytham St Annes
Anglo-Scots
English people of Scottish descent
English footballers
Scottish footballers
England semi-pro international footballers
Association football forwards
Oldham Athletic A.F.C. players
Vasalunds IF players
Scarborough F.C. players
Southport F.C. players
York City F.C. players
Chester City F.C. players
Hamilton Academical F.C. players
Northwich Victoria F.C. players
Kidsgrove Athletic F.C. players
Leigh Genesis F.C. players
Queen of the South F.C. players
Morecambe F.C. players
Stafford Rangers F.C. players
Hyde United F.C. players
Droylsden F.C. players
Workington A.F.C. players
Bradford (Park Avenue) A.F.C. players
National League (English football) players
English Football League players
Northern Premier League players
Twin sportspeople
English twins
Alumni of Edge Hill University